1015 Christa, provisional designation , is a dark background asteroid from the outermost regions of the asteroid belt, approximately  in diameter. It was discovered on 31 January 1924, by German astronomer Karl Reinmuth at the Heidelberg-Königstuhl State Observatory in southwest Germany. The meaning of this asteroids's name is unknown.

Orbit and classification 

Christa is a non-family asteroid from the main belt's background population. It orbits the Sun in the outermost asteroid belt at a distance of 2.9–3.5 AU once every 5 years and 9 months (2,096 days; semi-major axis of 3.21 AU). Its orbit has an eccentricity of 0.09 and an inclination of 9° with respect to the ecliptic.

The body's observation arc begins at Heidelberg in February 1924, two days after its official discovery observation.

Physical characteristics 

In the Tholen classification, Christa is a common C-type asteroid, while in the SMASS classification, it is a Xc-subtype that transitions from the carbonaceous C-type to the X-type asteroids. It has also been characterized as a primitive P-type asteroid by the Wide-field Infrared Survey Explorer (WISE).

Rotation period 

In April 2005, a first rotational lightcurve of Christa was obtained from photometric observations by French amateur astronomers Raymond Poncy and René Roy. Lightcurve analysis gave a rotation period of 12.189 hours with a brightness variation of 0.20 magnitude. In January 2009, a refined period of 11.230 hours and an amplitude of 0.12 magnitude was measured by photometrist Brian Warner at his Palmer Divide Observatory in Colorado, United States.

Diameter and albedo 

According to the surveys carried out by the Infrared Astronomical Satellite IRAS, the Japanese Akari satellite and the NEOWISE mission of NASA's WISE telescope, Christa measures between 82.35 and 101.04 kilometers in diameter and its surface has a low albedo between 0.04 and 0.064. The Collaborative Asteroid Lightcurve Link adopts the results obtained by IRAS, that is, an albedo of 0.0459 with a diameter of 96.94 kilometers based on an absolute magnitude of 9.03.

Naming 

Any reference of this minor planet's name to a person or occurrence is unknown.

Unknown meaning 

Among the many thousands of named minor planets, Christa is one of 120 asteroids, for which no official naming citation has been published.

Notes

References

External links 
 Asteroid Lightcurve Database (LCDB), query form (info )
 Dictionary of Minor Planet Names, Google books
 Asteroids and comets rotation curves, CdR – Observatoire de Genève, Raoul Behrend
 Discovery Circumstances: Numbered Minor Planets (1)-(5000) – Minor Planet Center
 
 

001015
Discoveries by Karl Wilhelm Reinmuth
Named minor planets
001015
001015
19240131